Telling Stories is the fifth album by American singer-songwriter Tracy Chapman, released on February 14, 2000, by Elektra Records. 

A two-disc special edition was released in Europe in 2000. The album is composed of contemporary rock songs in the first half, and folk songs in the second half. 

The record marked a return to shorter songs for Tracy; on New Beginning they had been somewhat longer.

Background and Writing
In 1999, Chapman began working on her first new record in four years, her longest ever hiatus at the time. For the record, she reunited with producer David Kershenbaum, the producer of her first album, Tracy Chapman (1988), and co-producer of her second album, Crossroads (1989). The song "Unsung Psalm" was originally written for her previous album, New Beginning (1995), but it didn't make it onto the album.

Track listing
All songs written by Tracy Chapman.

Cover versions 
 "Three Little Birds" is a Bob Marley cover. The song was originally released on the album Exodus in 1977.
 "House of the Rising Sun" is a cover of a traditional folk song. It was firstly released by Ashley and Foster on the single Rising Sun Blues under the same title in 1933.

Trivia 
 "Three Little Birds" was recorded at the TNT concert and television special One Love: An All Star Tribute to Bob Marley in Oracabessa on December 4, 1999.
 "House of the Rising Sun" was recorded at the Greek Theatre, Berkeley and the A&M Studios in Los Angeles in 1990. It seems, that it is actually more a live in the studio recording than a real live recording because you don't hear any crowd noise. 
 "Mountains o' Things" was recorded at the Montreux Jazz Festival on July 4, 1988.
 "Behind the Wall" was recorded at The Donmar Warehouse in London on March 25, 1988.
 "Baby Can I Hold You" is the same version as the one that was originally released on the album Tracy Chapman in 1988.

Personnel

Musicians

Technical personnel

Charts

Weekly charts

Year-end charts

Singles
Billboard (United States)

Certifications

References

2000 albums
Albums produced by David Kershenbaum
Elektra Records albums
Tracy Chapman albums